The Estadio Armando "Kory" Leyson is a multi-use stadium in Guasave, Sinaloa.  It is currently used mostly for football matches and is the home stadium for Diablos Azules de Guasave  The stadium has a capacity of 9,000 people.

References

External links

Estadio Armando "Kory" Leyson
Athletics (track and field) venues in Mexico
Sports venues in Sinaloa
Guasave